Scheck is a German surname. Notable people with the surname include:

Barry Scheck (born 1949), American lawyer
Denis Scheck (born 1964), German literary critic, journalist, television presenter, and translator
Frank Scheck, American film critic

See also
Schleck

German-language surnames